The Huawei Mate 50 is a series of EMUI-based smartphone manufactured by Huawei. They were announced on September 6, 2022 and released on September 28, 2022.

References

External links 
 
 
 

Huawei smartphones
Mobile phones introduced in 2022
Android (operating system) devices
Mobile phones with multiple rear cameras
Mobile phones with 4K video recording